Gilles Simon was the defending champion but chose not to defend his title.

Michael Russell won the title after defeating David Guez 6–0, 6–1 in the final.

Seeds

Draw

Finals

Top half

Bottom half

References
Main Draw
Qualifying Draw

Internationaux de Nouvelle-Caledonie - Singles
2007 Singles